On January 21, 2009, Zhu Haiyang (朱海洋), a graduate student from Ningbo, China, decapitated another graduate student, Yang Xin (杨欣), at Virginia Tech.

Zhu had fallen in love with Yang. However, Yang already had a boyfriend she intended to marry. After learning about this, Zhu attacked Yang and cut off her head. Zhu was then sentenced to life in prison for murder.

Background 
Zhu Haiyang was 25 years old and Yang Xin was 22 when Zhu beheaded Yang.

Yang Xin 
On January 8, 2009, Ms. Yang, from Beijing, arrived to Virginia Tech in Blacksburg to study for a master's degree in accounting.

Yang Xin went to social events with other international students and had settled in and started making friends. Yang was described as a "sweet young woman".

Zhu Haiyang 
Zhu was from Ningbo, China. He pursued a PhD in agricultural and applied economics at Virginia Tech, starting in August, 2008.

Zhu was initially helping Yang adapt to campus life.

Zhu had fallen in love with Yang and even wrote a love letter (found in his dormitory) expressing his deep affection for her. It expressed that Yang Xin was beautiful and that Zhu would treasure her forever. Zhu had also asked Yang to be his girlfriend.

But on the morning of January 20, 2009, Yang rejected Zhu as Yang already had a boyfriend she was planning to marry. In a letter titled "Will", Zhu said he was heartbroken by Yang's rejection and that Yang's fiance could not compare to Zhu's background and education. Zhu also wrote that Yang should have seen that Zhu would have been the best husband for her.

2007 Virginia Tech shooting 

Two years prior, on April 16, 2007, Seung-Hui Cho went on a mass shooting spree, killing 32 people at Virginia Tech before also killing himself. This event led to the university improving its overall security system to protect their students and faculty.

By the Clery Act, the university was obligated to disclose all information on the shooting to the campus and nearby areas. Virginia Tech informed the students about the situation nearly two hours after the first shooting. On December 9, 2010 the U.S. Department of Education said that Virginia Tech violated the Clery Act. On March 29, 2011, Virginia Tech was fined $55,000 for failing to notify campus students and faculty in time.

Later the university appealed saying they complied with the Department of Education's guidelines in a handbook. On March 30, 2012, the Department of Education overturned the fine, saying that they did not violate the Clery Act and had issued warnings in a timely manner. In a statement, they said: “If the later shootings at Norris Hall had not occurred, it is doubtful that the timing of the email would have been perceived as too late.”

After the shooting, the university canceled classes for the rest of the week. The university also closed Norris Hall for the rest of the semester. Students were allowed to shorten their semester and receive a grade. The school provided counseling services for students and faculty. On April 17, the day after the shooting, the university held a candlelight vigil and a memorial at Cassell Coliseum, including a speech by President George W. Bush.

As a result of the mass shooting, the campus installed an alert system to notify students immediately rather than delay for two hours. In 2009 the night Zhu decapitated Yang, after Zhu was arrested, this school security system informed 30,000 subscribers in half an hour.

Moreover, whereas in the 2007 shooting, classes were canceled for a week and buildings were closed for a semester, after Zhu killed Yang and Zhu was arrested (Wednesday), classes were held as normal on the following day (Thursday) across the campus.

Just as in the 2007 shooting, after Zhu murdered Yang, the university once again provided counseling to students and faculty. Officials also contacted the families of the victims in the 2007 shooting as well as Yang Xin's family.

Murder 
On January 21, 2009, Wednesday morning, Zhu purchased an 8-inch butcher knife which he used to murder Yang along with a claw hammer and two other knives. After buying the weapons, Zhu called Yang a dozen times.

On January 21, around 7pm Wednesday night, Zhu attacked Yang with a knife and decapitated Yang while the two were having coffee at the Au Bon Pain restaurant at the Graduate Life Center.

Yang had many wounds on her arms and hands as she was trying to fight Zhu. Eventually, Yang fell, and Zhu cut off her head. When the police arrived, Zhu was holding Yang's head, and there was blood on Zhu.

Aftermath

Police investigation 
Nicole Irvine from the Virginia Tech police department said she saw Yang's body lying on the ground and Zhu walking towards her with Yang's head in his hand. When the police ordered Zhu to put his hands in the air, he dropped the head to the ground. Irvine found a kitchen knife on the cafe table, and Zhu told her that he had a hammer and more knives in his backpack.

Corey Cox was a cafe worker who witnessed the attack. Cox said that Zhu lunged at Yang and cut her head off with a knife. Zhu was on top of Yang, and while he was cutting off her head, Zhu was staring at Yang with a "blank, determined" look on his face. Cox hid behind the counter and called 911 while his manager and the other customers fled from the shop.

Seven other cafe workers informed the police that Zhu and Yang were not arguing before the attack.

Investigators asked to search Zhu's phone, computer, and diaries for clues on the attack.

Kim Beisecker, the director of the Cranwell International Center, said that Zhu had only recently met Yang. Zhu was listed as one of Ms. Yang's emergency contacts.

Zhu's landlord Will Segar said that Zhu behaved strangely and belligerently. For example, Zhu rented an apartment with two other people. One time Zhu refused to turn up the heat in his apartment, which caused the pipes to freeze and break. Segar then installed a thermostat, but Zhu then shut down the heater.

Virginia Tech had a security notification system that was set up after the 2007 shootings. On Wednesday night when Zhu decapitated Yang, this system sent about 60,000 emergency notifications to 30,000 subscribers in half an hour. The director of the Office of Recovery and Support at Virginia Tech said the experience was "retraumatizing" following the 2007 shooting.

Prosecutors described Zhu as "obsessed" and "jilted". While Zhu was held at the Montgomery County jail, he was also evaluated at a mental hospital.

Sentence 
Zhu was charged with first-degree murder and sentenced on April 19, 2010.

Montgomery County Judge Gino Williams certified the murder charges against Zhu. In December, 2009, the plea hearing was held in Christiansburg, Virginia.

In April, 2010, Montgomery Circuit Judge Robert Turk sentenced Zhu Haiyang to life imprisonment without parole.

Attorney Brad Finch described Zhu's murder as "extremely brutal" and was pleased that Turk sentenced Zhu to life in prison.

In prison, Zhu wrote a letter saying that Yang's rejecting him "forced" him to kill her as Zhu loved her so much.

Reactions 
The Virginia Tech campus was shocked by Zhu's crimes. Virginia Tech president Charles W. Steger wrote in a letter to the campus community that their hearts "go out to the victim [Yang Xin] and her family". It was the first murder on the campus since the 2007 Virginia Tech shooting.

See also 

 Virginia Tech shooting, massacre that occurred on the same campus Virginia Tech, perpetrated by Seung-Hui Cho
 Killing of Tim McLean, another decapitation case perpetrated by Vince Weiguang Li

References 

2009 murders in the United States
Bullying in the United States
People murdered in Virginia
2009 in Virginia
Female murder victims
Incidents of violence against women
Virginia Tech
January 2009 crimes in the United States
Deaths by decapitation
Chinese people murdered abroad